“Henri Joyeux” (born 28th June 1945) is a French oncologist surgeon, nutrition specialist and writer. After graduating from the University of Montpellier, he became a surgeon in general oncology in 1972, and a professor in digestive surgery and oncology. He worked at the Curie Institute of Paris from 1992 to 1997 and became a member of the New York Academy of Sciences in 1992. He wrote many general-interest books about health and nutrition, some of which sold over 500,000 copies, and were translated in many languages. He became a public figure in 2000, appearing on television and giving talks. He was a member of the French Economic, Social and Environmental Council from 2010 to 2015. His skeptical views on vaccination  and on non-traditional families  have made him a controversial figure.

Education 
Henri Joyeux was born in Montpellier, where he studied medicine. He got his PhD from the University of Montpellier in 1972 with a thesis on artificial gut with total parenteral nutrition.

Medical career 
In 1973, Henri Joyeux became surgeon at the Regional Cancer Institute of Montpellier. He was also appointed director of the Laboratory of Nutrition and Experimental Oncology at the Cancer Institute of Montpellier in 1972, at the age of only 27. In 1980, he became professor of oncology at the University of Montpellier, and then professor of general surgery in 1986. 

Henri Joyeux was awarded the Antoine Lacassagne award in 1986 for his research on artificial nutrition and its therapeutic use in digestive track cancers. He joined the Curie Institute of Paris as head of the Visceral and Digestive Surgery Department in 1992 and became a member of the New York Academy of Sciences on the same year. Two years later, in 1994, he became a member of the French National Academy of Surgery. 

In 2008, he was made Chevalier (Knight) of the Legion of Honour for "41 years of service in civil, military and associative activities".

He retired in 2014.

Politics, society and publication

Political activity 
Henri Joyeux was elected as municipal councillor in Ornaisons, a small commune in the Aude department, in 1983. His term ended in 1989.

During the 1989 European Parliament election, he led a list named "L'Alliance" (center-right) which obtained 0.75% of the votes cast (136,230 votes).

Family 
In 2001, he was elected as president of Familles de France, one of the biggest family associations in France. He held this position until 2013. During his term, he joined the National Union of Family Associations (UNAF) as vice-president. In 2013, he publicly opposed the bill allowing same-sex marriage and adoption for same-sex couples

From 2010 to 2015, as vice-president of the UNAF, he was a member of the French Economic, Social and Environmental Council

Health and nutrition 
Warning against the influence of food advertising and its promotion of bad nutritional habits for children and young adolescents, Henri Joyeux launched in 2001 the very first "fruit pub" in a school. Its aim was to encourage pupils to replace snacks and candies by fruits during the break.

Over the following years, Henri Joyeux became increasingly popular with the general public, namely because of his positions on nutrition and health. Many of his books were best-sellers, some selling over 500,000 copies, such as Changez d’alimentation. Some of them have been translated in several languages, including Portuguese, Spanish, Russian and Italian. Henri Joyeux is regularly referred to as a "publishing phenomenon" by the media, as he holds conferences "to packed house"everywhere in France and abroad.

References 

1945 births
Living people
University of Montpellier alumni
French oncologists
20th-century French physicians
20th-century French politicians
21st-century French physicians